Honeymoon Limited is a 1935 American film.

Plot
A publisher bets an author that he won't be able to write a romantic adventure novel while on a walking trip from New York to San Francisco.

Cast
 Neil Hamilton as Dick Spencer Gordon/Gulliver
 Irene Hervey as Judy Randall
 Lloyd Hughes as Henry Townsend
 Henry Kolker as Mr. Randall
 Lorin Raker as Babe Dawes/Molly Carver
 June Filmer as Jill Randall - Grandchild
 Joy Filmer as Jack Randall - Grandchild
 George 'Gabby' Hayes as Jasper Pinkham
 Helene Costello as Mrs. Randell
 Emerson Treacy as Bridegroom
 Gertrude Astor as Lady Devonshire
 Lee Moran as Reporter
 Virginia Brissac as Mrs. Van Twerp

Production
Monogram bought the story from Vida Hurst in March 1934.

In March 1935 it was announced the film would be supervised by Mrs Wallace Reid. She had already produced Women Must Dress and Redhead for Monogram.

Neil Hamilton appeared in the film under a two picture contract he signed with Trem Carr, head of Monogram. The other he did under contract was Keeper of the Bees.

It was the third film Lubin directed for Monogram.  The Los Angeles Times said Lubin "had directed very successfully one or two other pictures which causes the belief that this feature will be especially bright lighted."

Filming took place in March 1935. The cast included several stars from the silent era such as Helene Costello, Neil Hamilton and Lloyd Hughes.

References

External links
Honeymoon Limited at IMDb
Honeymoon Limited at Letterbox DVD
Honeymoon Limited at BFI
Complete press kit at William Emerson Archive
Honeymoon Limited at TCMDB
Review of film at Variety

1935 films
1935 comedy films
American comedy films
Films directed by Arthur Lubin
American black-and-white films
1930s English-language films
1930s American films